HLA-DR17 (DR17) is an HLA-DR serotype that recognizes the DRB1*0301 and *0304 gene products. DR17 is found at high frequency in Western Europe (such as Western Ireland, N. Spain, Sardinia). DR17 is part of the broader antigen group HLA-DR3 and is very similar to the group HLA-DR18.

Serology

DR17 recognizes the DRB1*0301, *0304 alleles.

Disease associations

By serotype
DR17 is associated with non-chronic sarcoidosis, infantile spasm/epilepsy, rabies vaccine-induced autoimmune encephalomyelitis and cardiovascular hypertrophy in subjects with arterial hypertension People with DR17 show a tendency toward benzylpenicilloyl allergies.

By allele
DRB1*0301: diabetes mellitus type 1, myositis, early onset Graves disease, type 1 autoimmune hepatitis, inflammatory inclusion body myositis. In autoimmune hepatitis,
DRB1*0301 correlates with more severe and difficult to treat disease.

By haplotype
DRB1*0301:DQA1*05:DQB1*0201 is associated with diabetes mellitus type 1, ovarian cancer, non-thymomic myasthenia gravis, idiopathic inflammatory myopathies, non-cancer associated Lambert-Eaton myasthenic syndrome and sarcoidosis

By phenotype
The DRB1*0301/DRB1*1501 heterozygote is linked to primary Sjögren's syndrome

Genetic Linkage 

HLA-DR17 is genetically linked to DR52 and HLA-DQ2 serotypes. These serotypes
are the result of gene products from the HLA-DRB3* and HLA DQA1*0501 and HLA DQB1*0201 alleles.
DRB1*0301 is frequently within by the "Super-B8" or ancestral HLA haplotype:

A*0101 : Cw*0701 : B*0801 : DRB1*0301 : DQA1*0501 : DQB1*0201

This haplotype is known as "Super B8", "European ancestral haplotype", or "AH8.1"

References 

3